Batocera parryi is a species of beetle in the family Cerambycidae. It was described by Hope in 1845. It is known from China, India, Laos, Java, Myanmar, Malaysia, Sumatra, and Vietnam.

Varietas
 Batocera parryi var. bimaculata Schwarzer, 1914
 Batocera parryi var. fabricii Thomson, 1878
 Batocera parryi var. guttata (Snellen van Vollenhoven, 1871)
 Batocera parryi var. immaculata Schwarzer, 1914
 Batocera parryi var. narada Kriesche, 1928

References

Batocerini
Beetles described in 1845
Beetles of Asia